In Greek mythology, Iolaus (Ancient Greek: Ἰόλαος Iólaos) was a Theban divine hero. He was famed for being Heracles' nephew and for helping with some of his Labors, and also for being one of the Argonauts.

Family 
Iolaus was the son of Iphicles and Automedusa, daughter of King Alcathous of Megara. He married Megara, and through her became the father of a Leipephilene. Through this daughter, Iolaus was considered to have fathered the mythic and historic line of the kings of Corinth, ending with Telestes.

Mythology

Relationship with Heracles 
Iolaus often acted as Heracles' charioteer and companion. Plutarch, describing the Theban Sacred Band in his life of Pelopidas, said "It is a tradition likewise that Iolaus, who assisted Hercules in his labours and fought at his side, was beloved of him; and Aristotle observes that, even in his time, lovers plighted their faith at Iolaus's tomb."

Adventures 
Iolaus provided essential help to Heracles in his battle against the Hydra, his second labor. Seeing that Heracles was being overwhelmed by the multi-headed monster (the Lernaean Hydra), who grew two heads in place of each one cut off, Iolaus helped by cauterizing each neck as Heracles beheaded it.

Heracles gave his wife, Megara, age thirty three, to Iolaus, then only sixteen years old – ostensibly because the sight of her reminded him of his murder of their three children. They had a daughter, Leipephilene. He was one of the Heraclidae.

In Sophocles' Philoctetes, Philoctetes was given Heracles' bow and arrow as reward for lighting the funeral pyre.

According to Diodorus Siculus, Iolaus was sent by Heracles to Sardinia, together with nine of the sons that he had with the fifty daughters of Thespius (the Thespiades), to colonize the island, giving rise to the Iolei people.

Iolaus and the Thespians were buried in Sardinia.

Aristotle said that Sardinia had practiced the rite of incubation, which is the liberation ritual of the people who were affected by nightmares and obsessions. These rituals included that the persons suffering from nightmares should sleep next to the tombs of heroes.

Simplicius of Cilicia adds, in the eight books of the Commentaries Aristotle, that "the places where they were deposited and preserved corpses of the nine heroes that Heracles got from the Thespians and who came to Sardinia with the colony of Iolaus, became the famous oracles."

Solinus says: "The Iolians, so named by him (Iolaus), added a temple to his tomb, because he had freed Sardinia from many ills".

Legacy 
The Theban gymnasium was named after Iolaus and the Iolaia or Iolaea, an athletic festival consisting of gymnastic and equestrian events, was held yearly in Thebes in his honor. The victors at the Iolaea were crowned with garlands of myrtle.

A genus of Lycaenid butterfly has been named after him.

An exoplanet around star HAT-P-42 (now named Lerna) is named after him as part of the IAU's NameExoWorlds project.

See also
 Hylas
 Norax
 Sardus

Notes

External links

Argonauts
Male lovers of Heracles
Theban characters in Greek mythology
Theban mythology
Mythology of Heracles